Ceratodalia is a genus of moths in the family Geometridae, containing only one species, Ceratodalia gueneata, which is found in western North America, ranging from British Columbia and Alberta to Colorado and California.

References

Hydriomenini
Taxa named by Alpheus Spring Packard
Monotypic moth genera
Moths described in 1876
Moths of North America